Glen Etive is a glen in the Highlands of Scotland. The River Etive rises on the peaks surrounding Rannoch Moor, with several tributary streams coming together at the Kings House Hotel, at the head of Glen Coe. From the Kings House, the Etive flows for about 18 km, reaching the sea loch, Loch Etive. The river and its tributaries are popular with whitewater kayakers and at high water levels it is a test piece of the area and a classic run.

At the north end of Glen Etive lie the two mountains known as the "Herdsmen of Etive": Buachaille Etive Mòr and Buachaille Etive Beag. Other peaks accessible from the Glen include Ben Starav, located near the head of Loch Etive, and Beinn Fhionnlaidh on the northern side of the glen. The scenic beauty of the glen has led to its inclusion the Ben Nevis and Glen Coe National Scenic Area, one of 40 such areas in Scotland.

A narrow road from the Kings House Hotel runs down the glen, serving several houses and farms. This road ends at the head of the loch, though rough tracks continue along both shores.

The River Etive is one of Scotland's most popular and challenging white water kayaking runs. It provides a multitude of solid Grade 4(5) rapids with a variety of falls and pool drops. It is home to a herd of Scottish red deer that have become accustomed to the presence of humans.

Mythology 
In the Ulster Cycle of Irish mythology, Deirdre and her love Naoise founded Glen Etive after fleeing Ulster.

The Fachen is also known as the Dwarf of Glen Etive.

Movie location 
Glen Etive has been used as the backdrop to many movies, among them Braveheart and Skyfall. The resulting influx of visitors has led to concerns about the spoilage of the glen through littering and fly-tipping.

Footnotes 

Etive
Valleys of Highland (council area)